Ewenny is a village and community (parish) on the River Ewenny in the Vale of Glamorgan, Wales.

Over the years the village has grown into the neighbouring village of Corntown to such an extent that there is no longer a clear boundary between the two. Corntown is within the community.

In 1987, scenes from the Doctor Who episode Delta and the Bannermen were filmed in the village.

History

Ewenny Priory
The village grew around the Priory and Church. The Norman church of St. Michael was built in the 12th century by one of the Norman knights of Glamorgan, William de Londres. His son Maurice founded the adjacent Benedictine priory in 1141 when he granted the church to the abbey of St. Peter at Gloucester, together with the churches of St Brides Major, St. Michael at Colwinston and the manor at Lampha.

The priory is widely regarded as one of the finest fortified religious buildings in Britain. 
Over the centuries the priory has sustained some damage, but nonetheless it is still inhabited by its current owners, the Turbervill family. The priory is not open to the public but the attached Church is still in use today.

Potteries

Records show that the pottery industry has existed in the area since 1427. This is probably because the materials required for the production of pottery are readily available in this area, including a local red earthenware, glaze materials, stone to build the kilns and coal to fire the pots in the kilns. There have been fifteen potteries in the Ewenny area at one time or another, all small family concerns.

The village is home to the Ewenny Pottery, founded in 1610 and the oldest working pottery in Wales. The business is run by the descendants of the pottery's original founders, the Jenkins family. The pottery is currently run by Alun Jenkins, son of Thomas Arthur Jenkins.

The Legend of the White Lady
Close to Ewenny Priory is an area of land known as White Lady's meadow and White Lady's Lane. It is said that the area is haunted by the Y Ladi Wen or the White Lady ghost. Few details are available about the ghost, but it is generally believed that she committed some terrible misdeed in the past and now her spirit must roam the earth in penance. There is a similar legend associated with Ogmore Castle. As these two locations are within a couple of miles of each other it is likely that the legends are related, or inspired by each other.

Other Points of Interest
The nearby Coed-y-Bwl nature reserve, more locally known as the "Daffodil woods" has around a quarter of a million ‘wild’ daffodils. The reserve was established in 1971 and in 1975 received a Prince of Wales trust award. The daffodils were planted in the early 19th century by Mrs Nicholl of Merthyr Mawr.

A Roman bridge is situated near the reserve.

Governance
Ewenny has a community council which elects or co-opts eight community councillors. Until 2022 the community was part of the county ward of Llandow/Ewenny for elections to the Vale of Glamorgan Council. It was transferred to the St Brides Major ward as a result of recommendations from the Local Democracy and Boundary Commission for Wales.

See also
List of monasteries dissolved by Henry VIII of England

References

Description of the Priory provided by Bridgend County Council
History of the village
Ewenny Pottery
The Village website

Images
Priory interior
Priory Exterior
St. Michael's Church
The Village Shop
Ewenny River

External links 
Geograph.co.uk, photos of Ewenny and surrounding area

Villages in the Vale of Glamorgan
Communities in the Vale of Glamorgan